Ilex mathewsii is a species of plant in the family Aquifoliaceae. It is endemic to Peru.

References

Endemic flora of Peru
mathewsii
Vulnerable plants
Taxonomy articles created by Polbot